Belle Epoque (also referenced in some sources as La Belle Epoque) was the name of a female vocal trio, based in Paris, France. The group first rose to popularity during the late 1970s with a disco remake of the song "Black Is Black", originally a hit in 1966 for the Spanish group Los Bravos.

History
Belle Epoque consisted of lead singer Evelyne Lenton, a French singer who began recording and performing in the early 1960s under the name Evy, and two back-up singers. Originally, the back-up singers were Jusy Fortes (also known as Judy Lisboa), originating from Cape Verde, and Marcia Briscoe (also known as Marcia Briscue), hailing from Atlanta, Georgia. However, over time, as Lenton notes, "The girls kept changing with the circumstances."

The trio scored a major European hit in 1977 with their disco remake of "Black Is Black". The Belle Epoque version was a top ten hit in many European countries, including number 2 in the UK Singles Chart (the same chart position that Los Bravos' original had reached there 11 years earlier). The song also became a number 1 hit in Australia in 1978.

In the US, Belle Epoque are better known for another song, "Miss Broadway", which charted at number 26 on the U.S. R&B chart and at number 92 on the Billboard Hot 100 in 1978. "Miss Broadway" and "Black Is Black" both rose to number 21 on Billboard's "National Disco Action Top 40" chart in summer 1977.

Other hits in continental Europe followed into the late 1970s. Lenton began recording solo again in 1983, although she has worked with contemporary music producers to craft remixes of "Black Is Black" and "Miss Broadway".

Name
In UK sources, such as David Roberts' British Hit Singles & Albums, the band is listed by the name "La Belle Epoque". In US sources, such as Joel Whitburn's Hot Dance/Disco 1974–2003 and Top Pop Singles 1955–2002, the group is listed as "Belle Epoque". Evelyne Lenton's official website lists the band's name as "Belle Epoque". "Belle Epoque" is also the name listed for the group on its first US album, Miss Broadway, released in 1977 on Big Tree Records (BT 76008). But the cover of their "Black Is Black" single (extended version) is shown as "La Belle Epoque". A reproduction of this cover can be seen online at YouTube.

Discography

Albums
Miss Broadway, 1977
Bamalama, 1978
Now, 1979

Singles

References

External links
Official MySpace page of Belle Epoque
Official website of Evy-Belle Epoque-Evelyne Lenton.
Kent Music Report

French dance music groups
French pop music groups
Eurodisco groups
Carrere Records artists
Big Tree Records artists
EMI Records artists